The men's 1500 metre freestyle event at the 1980 Summer Olympics was held on 21 and 22 July at the Swimming Pool at the Olimpiysky Sports Complex. This event is noteworthy as Vladimir Salnikov became the first man to swim the 1500m freestyle under 15 minutes.

Records
Prior to this competition, the existing world and Olympic records were as follows.

The following records were established during the competition:

Results

Heats

Final

References

F
Men's events at the 1980 Summer Olympics